Giuseppe Sellitto or Sellitti (Naples, 1700-1777) was an Italian opera composer. He is remembered for his Egyptian opera Nitocri, and intermezzi including Il Cinese rimpatriato and La Franchezza delle donne.

Recordings
 Aria: Anche un misero arboscello (from the opera Nitocri) on Venezia recital by Max Emanuel Cencic (countertenor) Il Pomo d'Oro, Riccardo Minasi, Virgin 2013

References

1700 births
1777 deaths
Italian Baroque composers
Italian male classical composers
18th-century Italian composers
18th-century Italian male musicians